VLC may refer to:

 Variable-length code, a code which maps source symbols to a variable number of bits
 The Very Light Car, prototype vehicle
 Visible light communication, a communications medium using fluorescent bulbs or LEDs
 Victorian Landcare Council, merged to form the Landcare Victoria Inc.
 Victorian Legislative Council, one of the two chambers of the Parliament of Victoria, Australia
 Visakha Law College, a private school in Andhra Pradesh, India
 VLC, IATA code for Valencia Airport, Spain
 VLC, pre-1928 call sign for Chatham Islands Radio, one of the Call signs in New Zealand
 VLC media player, a free software cross-platform multimedia player and framework